In set theory, the ground axiom states that the universe of set theory is not a nontrivial set-forcing extension of an inner model.

References

Axioms of set theory